The Nokia C1-01 is a mobile telephone handset produced by Nokia. Nokia C1-01 is available in a number of languages depending on which territory it is marketed for. Models sold in South Asia support at least twelve languages: English, Hindi, Gujarati, Marathi, Punjabi, Tamil, Kannada, Telugu, Malayalam, Assamese, Bengali and Odia.

A revision of the C1-01 was released as the Nokia C1-03 with 32 MB internal memory instead of 16 MB and without EDGE support. The two are identical in appearance and all other features.

Features 
This is a basic phone without many added features but does include a Camera, an MP3 Player, an internet browser, Bluetooth support and a microSD slot.

Specification sheet

References

External links
 Nokia C1-01 Device specification at Nokia Developer

Mobile phones introduced in 2010
C1-01
Mobile phones with user-replaceable battery